Veronique Labonte (born 15 September 1980) is a road cyclist from Canada. She participated at the 2012 UCI Road World Championships.

References

External links
 profile at Procyclingstats.com

1980 births
Canadian female cyclists
Living people
Place of birth missing (living people)
20th-century Canadian women
21st-century Canadian women